Intransitive can mean:
 the opposite of transitive, see Transitivity (disambiguation)
 Intransitivity, a mathematical property of binary relations
 Intransitive verb, a verb that does not allow an object 
 Intransitive case, the grammatical case for arguments of intransitive verbs
 Intransitive Recordings, an independent American record label

See also 
 Nontransitive game
 Nontransitive dice